This list of Hollywood strikes names the industrial strikes organized by Hollywood trade unions such as SAG-AFTRA—formerly the Screen Actors Guild (SAG) and the American Federation of Television and Radio Artists (AFTRA)—the Writers Guild of America (WGA), and the Directors Guild of America (DGA). Demands for better compensation—especially residuals—have been a major goal of the strikes.

 2007–2008 Writers Guild of America strike, 14 weeks, Nov 2007 – Feb 2008
 2000 commercial actors strike, nearly six months
 1988 commercial actors strike, 3 weeks
 1988 Writers Guild of America strike, 22 weeks (the longest strike in the guild's history)
 1987 Directors strike, 3 hours and 5 minutes (the shortest of all Hollywood strikes)
 1985 Writers strike, two weeks
 1981 Writers Guild of America strike, three months
 1980 actors strike, three months
 1973 Writers Guild of America screenwriters strike, three and a half months
 1960 Writers Guild of America strike, 21 weeks
 1960 Actors strike, led by SAG President Ronald Reagan, six weeks
 1952 Actors strike, two and a half months
 1945 Set decorators Hollywood Black Friday strike, six months
 1942–44 musicians' strike, thirteen months plus (the longest Hollywood strike)
 1941 Disney animators' strike, four months
 1936 Hollywood worker's strike backed by American Federation of Labor against the use of US Army and Navy involvement in motion picture production

See also
 List of strikes
 Residual (entertainment industry)
 Timeline of labor issues and events
 Actors Strike 1986

References

Labor disputes in California